Plasmodium heischi is a parasite of the genus Plasmodium subgenus Sauramoeba. As in all Plasmodium species P. heischi, has both vertebrate and insect hosts. The vertebrate hosts for this parasite are reptiles.

Taxonomy
The parasite was first described by Garnham and Telford in 1984.

Distribution 
This species was described in Kenya.

Hosts 
The only host for this species are the skinks Mabuya striata.

References 

heischi